The Dassam Falls (also known as Dassam Ghagh) is a waterfall located near Taimara village in Bundu police station of Ranchi district in the Indian state of Jharkhand.

Etymology
Dassam is a changed form of word Da:song which means in mundari language the act of pouring water. Da: means water and song means pouring or measuring. The water fall resembles like somebody is pouring water so the name was Da:song earlier but afterwards the name was changed to Dassam.

Geography

Location

Note: The map alongside presents some of the notable locations in the district. All places marked in the map are linked in the larger full screen map.

The falls

The Dassam Falls is a natural cascade across the Kanchi River, a tributary of the Subarnarekha River. The sound of water echoes all around the place. Dassam Falls at one of the edges of the Ranchi plateau is one of the many scarp falls in the region.

The Dassam Falls is an example of a nick point caused by rejuvenation. Knick point, also called a nick point or simply nick, represents breaks in slopes in the longitudinal profile of a river caused by rejuvenation. The break in channel gradient allows water to fall vertically giving rise to a waterfall.

The water of the Dassam Falls is very clean and clear. It is natural for a tourist to be enticed  to enter the water for a bath or swim but tourists are warned not to do so because of the current that is generated.  There have been many cases of drowning in Dassam Falls. Nine people died of drowning between 2001 and 2006.

Transport

External links

Jharkhand Tourism Attractions

See also
List of waterfalls in India
List of waterfalls in India by height

References

Waterfalls of Jharkhand
Ranchi district
Waterfalls of India